Datuk Wira Ibrahim bin Durum is a Malaysian politician and currently serves as Speaker of the Malacca State Legislative Assembly since 27 December 2021.

Election results

Honours 
  :
  Companion Class I of the Exalted Order of Malacca (DMSM) – Datuk (1994)
  Knight Commander of the Exalted Order of Malacca (DCSM) – Datuk Wira (2020)

References 

Living people
Malaysian people of Malay descent
Malaysian Muslims
People from Malacca
United Malays National Organisation politicians
Members of the Malacca State Legislative Assembly
Malacca state executive councillors
Speakers of the Malacca State Legislative Assembly
1986 births